The 2013 Continental Indoor Football League season will be the Continental Indoor Football League's eighth overall season. The regular season will start on Friday February 8, with the Marion Blue Racers visiting the Saginaw Sting at the Dow Event Center, and will end with the 2013 CIFL Championship Game, the league's championship game being held on, or around, May 18. The league approved the expansion of the playoff format from four teams to six teams (with the top two teams receiving byes).

Schedule
For the 2013 season there will be a 10-game, 12-week regular season running from February to April. Each team will host 5 games, and have five away games. For the first time in league history, there will be Monday night games.

Regular season standings

Playoffs

Rule changes
Starting in 2013 teams will be allowed to expand their active roster from 19 players up to 21 this year and are being required to carry a backup Quarterback and Kicker.
Teams will score a single point on their kickoff if the ball makes its way through the uprights.
Defensive Backs are not allowed to blitz
Starting in 2013 coaches will be permitted to coach on the field again, which will improve communication between them and their players

Coaching changes

Pre-season

In-season

Awards

Regular season awards

1st Team All-CIFL

2nd Team All-CIFL

References

External links
 CIFL website